Munshiganj, also historically and coloquillay known as Bikrampur, is a district in central Bangladesh. It is a part of the Dhaka Division and borders Dhaka District.

Geography
Total land area  is 235974 acres (954 km2), out of which 138472 acres (560 km2) are cultivable and 5609 acres (23 km2) are fallow land. It has no forest area. 40277 acres (163 km2) of land is irrigated while 26242 acres (106 km2) of land is under river. It has 14 rivers of 155 km passing through.

Administration
The district consists of 6 upazilas:

Lohajang Upazila
Sreenagar Upazila
Munshiganj Sadar Upazila
Sirajdikhan Upazila
Tongibari Upazila
Gazaria Upazila

Demographics 

According to the 2011 Bangladesh census, Munshiganj District had a population of 1,445,660, of which 721,552 were males and 724,108 were females. Rural population was 1,259,554 (87.13%) while urban population was 186,106 (12.87%). Munshiganj had a literacy rate 56.09% for the population 7 years and above: 56.44% for males and 55.74% for females.

91.92% are Muslims, 7.93% Hindus. Although Hindus were once over 40% of the district, most have left to India.

Notable people 
Revolutionary nationalists
 M. Hamidullah Khan, Bangladesh Forces, Sector Commander, Sector 11, Bangladesh War of Independence 1971
 Jagadish Chandra Bose, Great Bengali physicist
 Badal Gupta, revolutionary against British India
 Benoy Basu, revolutionary against British India
 Dinesh Gupta, revolutionary against British India
 Sarojini Naidu, Politician 
 Chittaranjan Das

Social and scientific
Sir Jagadish Chandra Bose, scientist
 Chashi Nazrul Islam, artist
 Humayun Azad, linguist, poet and novelist
 Durga Mohan Das, Brahmo reformer
 Dwarkanath Ganguly, Brahmo reformer

Art, culture and sports
 Atiśa, Buddhist religious leader and master
 Brojen Das, the first Bangladeshi and Asian to swim across the English Channel, and the first person to cross it four times
 Imdadul Haq Milan, writer and media personality
 Buddhadeb Bosu, writer, poet, playwright, essayist
Shirshendu Mukhopadhyay, author, Teacher
 Ananta Jalil, actor, director, producer, businessman, and philanthropist
 Tahsan Rahman Khan, singer-songwriter, composer, actor and model.
 Tele Samad, Actor
Radhu Karmakar, noted Indian cinematographer and director in Hindi cinema
 Azmeri Haque Badhon, actress, Dentist
 Shimul Yousuf, actress, singer
 Nazma Anwar, actor
 Munni Saha, journalist, television host
Public affairs
 A. N. M. Hamidullah, First Governor, Bangladesh Bank 
 Fakhruddin Ahmed, former chief adviser, Non-Party Caretaker Government of Bangladesh, 2007–2008.
 Iajuddin Ahmed, former President of Bangladesh
 A.Q.M. Badruddoza Chowdhury, former shortest term appointed President of Bangladesh
 M. A. Naser, pioneer in Engineering Education, former Vice Chancellor or BUET, Ekushey Padak recipient

See also
 Districts of Bangladesh
 Dhaka Division
 Munshiganj Vihara
 Idrakpur Fort

Notes

References

 
Districts of Bangladesh